Gorno-Badakhshan, officially the Badakhshan Mountainous Autonomous Region, is an autonomous region in eastern Tajikistan, in the Pamir Mountains. It makes up nearly forty-five percent of the country's land area, but only two percent of its population.

Name 
The official English name of the autonomous region is the Badakhshan Mountainous Autonomous Region. "Gorno-Badakhshan" literally means "mountainous Badakhshan" and is derived from the Russian name of the autonomous region, . The Russian abbreviation "GBAO" is also commonly used in English-language publications by national and international bodies such as the government of Tajikistan and the United Nations.

History 
Prior to 1895, several semi-self governing statelets, including Darwaz, Shughnun-Rushan and Wakhan, ruled over the territories that are today a part of Gorno-Badakhshan Autonomous Region in Tajikistan and Badakhshan Province in Afghanistan. The territory was claimed by the Chinese and Russian empires, as well as the Emirate of Afghanistan. The Chinese claimed control over the entire Pamir Mountains.

In the 1890s, the Chinese, Russian, and Afghan governments signed a series of agreements which divided Badakhshan, but China nonetheless continued to contest these borders.

The Soviet government established Gorno-Badakhshan in January 1925 as an autonomous republic, and later in 1929 as an autonomous oblast, of the Tajik Soviet Socialist Republic (Tajik SSR). During the 1950s, the native inhabitants of Gorno-Badakhshan, mostly ethnic Pamiris, were forcibly relocated to southwestern Tajikistan. Gorno-Badakhshan absorbed some of the territory of the Gharm Oblast when that territory was dissolved in 1955.

When the Tajik Civil War broke out in 1992, the local government in Gorno-Badakhshan declared independence from Tajikistan. During the civil war, many Pamiris were targeted for killings by rival groups and Gorno-Badakhshan became a bastion of the opposition. The Gorno-Badakhshan government later backed down from its calls for independence.

However, the government of the Republic of China (ROC) based in Taipei does not recognize this treaty and continues to claim the territory, as reflected in its official maps.

A number of violent clashes and demonstrations have occurred in the region since the end of the civil war, with major incidences of civil unrest in 2012, 2014, 2018, 2021, and 2022. Clashes erupted on 24 July 2012 between the Tajik military and militants loyal to the former warlord Tolib Ayombekov, after Ayombekov was accused of murdering a Tajik general. On 18 May 2022, around 200 anti-government demonstrators blocked a road in Rushon which led to the regional capital Khorog. Some of the demonstrators later ambushed a security convoy on the same road, resulting in the deaths of eight militants and one officer, the injuries of 13 officers, and the arrests of 70 assailants. The Tajik interior ministry stated that the attack was an attempt to "destabilise the social and political situation" in the region.

Districts and geography 

Darvoz District is the western "beak" of the province. West-central Gorno-Badakhshan is mostly a series of east–west mountain ranges separated by valleys of rivers that flow into the Panj River. The districts correspond the river valleys. Murghob District occupies the eastern half of the province and is mostly a desolate plateau with high mountains on the west.

The districts of Gorno-Badakhshan are:
 Darvoz District (westernmost, north)
 Vanj District (west, north)
 Rushon District (west, center)
 Shughnon District (west, center)
 Roshtqal'a District (west, south)
 Ishkoshim District (west, southernmost)
 Murghob District (eastern two-thirds)

Gorno-Badakhshan covers the entire eastern part of Tajikistan and borders China's Xinjiang Uyghur Autonomous Region to the east, Afghanistan's Badakhshan Province to the south, and Kyrgyzstan's Osh Region to the north. Within Tajikistan, Gorno-Badakhshan's western border is with the Districts of Republican Subordination (DRP) and the tip of its southwestern finger (Darvoz District) borders Khatlon Region. The highest elevations in the region are in the Pamir Mountains (notably Mount Imeon), nicknamed "the roof of the world" by locals. Three of the five 7,000 meter summits in Central Asia are located here, including Ismoil Somoni Peak (formerly Communism Peak, and, before that, Stalin Peak; 7,495 m), Ibn Sina Peak (formerly Lenin Peak, and still known by that name on its Kyrgyz flank; 7,134 m), and Peak Korzhenevskaya (7,105 m).

Demographics 

The population of Gorno-Badakhshan slightly declined from 206,004 to 205,949 between the censuses in 2000 and 2010. The population as of 2019 is estimated at 226,900. According to the State Statistical Committee of Tajikistan, the main ethnic group in Gorno-Badakhshan are Pamiris. The remainder of the population is ethnic Kyrgyz and other nationalities. The largest city in Gorno-Badakhshan is Khorog, with a population of 30,300 (2019 ); Murghab is the second largest, with about 4,000 residents.

Gorno-Badakhshan is home to a number of distinct languages and dialects of the Pamir languages group.  The Pamiri language speakers represented in Gorno-Badakshan are speakers of Shughni, Rushani, Wakhi, Ishkashimi, Sarikoli, Bartangi, Khufi, Yazgulyam, and Oroshani. Vanji, formerly spoken in the Vanj River valley, became extinct in the 19th century.
There is a sizable population of Kyrgyz speakers in the Murghab district. Russian and Tajik are also widely spoken throughout Gorno-Badakhshan. The majority religion in Gorno-Badakhshan is Ismaili Shi'ite and adherence to the Aga Khan is widespread.

Government

Soviet era 
The First Secretary of the Gorno–Badakhshan Regional Committee of the Communist Party of Tajikistan was the highest position in the region during the Soviet era.

List of first secretaries

Since independence 
The Chairman of the Badakhshan Mountainous Autonomous Region is the head of the regional government. They are appointed by the President of Tajikistan.

List of chairmen

Transport 
Only two easily navigable roads connect Gorno-Badakhshan to the outside world, Khorog–Osh and Khorog–Dushanbe, both of which are segments of the Pamir Highway. A third road from Khorog to Tashkurgan in China through the Kulma Pass is very rough. Gorno-Badakhshan is separated from the Pakistani territories of Khyber Pakhtunkhwa and Gilgit Baltistan by the narrow, but nearly impassable, Wakhan Corridor. Another road leads from Khorog to Wakhan and across the Afghan border.

Energy 
In 2019, the European Union and Germany, in coordination with Tajikistan, committed 37 million euros to finance the construction of an 11 MW run-of-the-river hydro power plant along the Shokhdara river. The project is intended to also supply energy to Badakhshan, Afghanistan.

Sports 
Khorog is the highest location where bandy is played.

Notable individuals

 Qimmatgul Aliberdiyeva
 Savsan Bandishoeva
 Nobovar Chanorov
 Nazarsho Dodkhudoev
 Akbarsho Iskandrov
 Davlat Khudonazarov
 Mirsaid Mirshakar
 Muboraksho Mirzoshoyev
 Qozidavlat Qoimdodov
 Nuqra Rahmatova
 Shodi Shabdolov
 Sabzajon Shoismoilova
 Shirinsho Shotemur
 Khudoyor Yusufbekov
 Gurminj Zavkibekov

See also 
 Extreme points of Tajikistan
 Tajik National Park

Notes

References

Further reading

External links 

 Map of the Gorno-Badakhshan region of Tajikistan 
 State agency on antiexclusive politics and support of business at Government of Republic of Tadjikistan

 
Regions of Tajikistan
States and territories established in 1925
1925 establishments in the Soviet Union
Autonomous regions
Tajik Soviet Socialist Republic
Autonomous oblasts of the Soviet Union